Suvorov Museum is a military museum dedicated to Alexander Suvorov in St. Petersburg, Russia.

Suvorov Museum may also refer to:

Suvorov Museum (Ochakiv), in Ochakiv, Ukraine
Suvorov Museum, Izmail, Izmail,  Ukraine
Suvorov Museum, Timanivka,  Ukraine